Woodville Historic District is a national historic district located at Lewiston Woodville, Bertie County, North Carolina. It encompasses 36 contributing buildings and 3 contributing sites in the village of Woodville.  They primarily date between 1801 and 1927, and include six pre-American Civil War houses, one antebellum church and 1870s rectory, two antebellum church cemeteries, and three early-20th century American Craftsman houses.

It was added to the National Register of Historic Places in 1998.

References

Historic districts on the National Register of Historic Places in North Carolina
Buildings and structures in Bertie County, North Carolina
National Register of Historic Places in Bertie County, North Carolina